An interdimensional being (also extra-dimensional, intra-dimensional) suggests an entity that can "time-travel and move out of the physical body into a spiritual one". The NASA website has a somewhat dated article called "The Science of Star Trek", by physicist David Allen Batchelor (5 May 2009), which considers some of the implementations in Star Trek. He says it's "the only science fiction series crafted with such respect for real science and intelligent writing", with some "imaginary science" mixed in; and considers it to be the "only science fiction series that many scientists watch regularly", like himself. He says it's "more faithful to science than any other science fiction series ever shown on television".

In movies and TV shows
Akira
Rick Sanchez, main character of Rick and Morty

In literature

The Time Machine (H. G. Wells)
The Time Machine by H. G. Wells describes time travelers as capable of interdimensional travel.

The protagonist describes the passing of time, and also treats it as if it were a spatial dimension. This is exactly how Wells devises the time machine mechanism in this particular work of fiction. Wells supposes that if time could simply be treated as space, then time machines would indeed operate correctly. In this case, Wells’ definition of a time traveler must be equivalent to that of an interdimensional being – an entity capable of traveling through unusual dimensional rifts that few other entities can enter.

From H. G. Wells' work: "'Clearly,' the Time Traveller proceeded, 'any real body must have extension in four directions: it must have Length, Breadth, Thickness, and—Duration. But through a natural infirmity of the flesh, which I will explain to you in a moment, we incline to overlook this fact. There are really four dimensions, three which we call the three planes of Space, and a fourth, Time. There is, however, a tendency to draw an unreal distinction between the former three dimensions and the latter, because it happens that our consciousness moves intermittently in one direction along the latter from the beginning to the end of our lives."

The Hitchhiker's Guide to the Galaxy (Douglas Adams)
The Hitchhiker's Guide to the Galaxy by Douglas Adams describes that mice are "merely the protrusion into our dimension of vast hyper-intelligent pan-dimensional beings". The protagonist Arthur Dent discovers that Earth "was commissioned, paid for, and run by mice" and that the mice were furious when it was destroyed.

Flatland (Edwin Abbott Abbott)
Flatland by Edwin Abbott Abbott describes the interactions of a two-dimensional square with an interdimensional being from a coexisting three-dimensional spacetime.

Fantasy

Universe dimensionality
An additional fictional work that does include universe dimensionality of some sort includes the Buffy the Vampire Slayer series, according to a particular academic source.

Others
Bill Cipher
It (Pennywise the Dancing Clown)

See also
Extraterrestrial life
Planetary civilization
Kardashev scale
Interdimensional hypothesis
Fourth dimension in literature
Half-Life (series)

References

Additional sources used
 Suppression and Transformation of the Maternal in Contemporary Women's Science Fiction
 Portals in Science Fiction (Google Scholar)

Science fiction themes
Fictional life forms
Alleged UFO-related entities
Marvel Comics dimensions
Fictional dimensions
Dimension